Narayan Tatu Rane (born 10 April 1952) is an Indian politician and former Chief Minister of Maharashtra. He currently serves as Minister of Micro, Small and Medium Enterprises in the Second Modi ministry. He has previously held Cabinet Ministry positions for Industry, Port, Employment and Self-employment; Revenue; and Industry in the Government of Maharashtra.

He was a member of Shiv Sena and opposition leader of Vidhan Sabha until July 2005, when he joined Indian National Congress party. He quit Congress in September 2017 and launched the Maharashtra Swabhiman Paksha. In 2018, he declared support for Bharatiya Janta Party and was elected to the Rajya Sabha on a BJP nomination. On 15 October 2019, he joined Bhartiya Janta Party and merged his party, Maharashtra Swabhiman Paksha, into the BJP.

Personal life 
Narayan Rane was born to Tatu Sitaram Rane and Laxmibai Rane in Chembur, Mumbai, Maharashtra. He dropped out from 11th grade. He has two sons: Nilesh and Nitesh Rane. Nitesh is a politician and member of the Maharashtra Legislative Assembly.

Political career

Shiv Sena
Rane joined Shiv Sena in his early twenties and started his political career as local 
Shakha Pramukh at Chembur, Mumbai. He then became the Councillor of Kopargaon. Under the BJP-Shiv Sena coalition government, Rane first received the Revenue Ministry portfolio. He succeeded Manohar Joshi as Chief Minister in 1999, when Joshi was forced to resign due to a land use controversy. Later that year, the BJP-Sena alliance led by Rane lost the October 1999 Maharashtra elections to an INC-NCP coalition. The election campaign opened a breach between Rane and Uddhav Thackeray, the president of Shiv Sena. Relations between Thackeray and Rane finally ruptured completely in 2005, when Rane submitted his resignation from the party. In response Thackeray  expelled Rane from the party on 3 July 2005, accusing Rane of "gangsterism" and "betrayal of the party."

Indian National Congress
Rane joined the Indian National Congress in 2005, receiving his old post as Revenue Minister under the Second Desmukh Ministry. In a 2005 by-election, he won re-election from his old Malvan seat in the Konkan region on a Congress ticket.  In the wake of 2008 Mumbai attacks, Vilasrao Deshmukh, then Chief Minister of Maharashtra resigned, and Sonia Gandhi elevated Ashok Chavan as Chief Minister. Rane accused Congress leadership of breaching its promises to make him Chief Minister, and was suspended by the party. After Rane apologized, the INC revoked this suspension. Prithviraj Chavan appointed Rane as Minister of Industry in his first ministry, elevating Balasheb Thorat to Rane's old Revenue portfolio. Rane resigned from the Cabinet in July 2014 over differences with the party's leadership on the INC's campaign effort. The BJP and SHS went on to claim victory in the 2014 Maharashtra Legislative Assembly election, in which Rane lost his bid for re-election to a Shiv Sena candidate.

In 2016, the INC appointed Rane as a member of the Maharashtra Legislative Council. The appointment did not suppress the increasingly public feud between Rane and Congress leadership, however, prompting speculation about Rane's future in the party. On 21 September 2017, Rane resigned both from the INC and from his membership on the Maharashtra Legislative Council.

Maharashtra Swabhiman Paksha 

Through press at the time expected Rane's resignation to result in an appointment to Devendra Fadnavis's cabinet, Shiv Sena, still led by Rane's longtime rival Uddhav Thackeray, threatened to withdraw from the BJP-led coalition if Rane was admitted. Temporarily without a party, Rane formed a new political party in October 2017 called the Maharashtra Swabhiman Paksha and indicated it would ally with Bharatiya Janata Party. However, when Rane ran for Rajya Sabha in 2018, he did so under a BJP party line.

Bharatiya Janata Party 
Rane merged his party, Maharashtra Swabhiman Paksha, with the Bharatiya Janata Party on October 15, 2019. Following that year's legislative assembly elections in Maharashtra, the BJP-Sena alliance broke down completely. During the July 2021 Cabinet reshuffle, Modi elevated Rane to Minister of Micro, Small and Medium Enterprises. Political writer Aditi Phadnis interpreted this as a BJP attempt to make inroads in the Marathi strongholds of their former allies, Shiv Sena.

Newspaper Prahaar
Rane launched the Marathi daily Prahaar on 8 October 2008, under the ownership of Rane Prakashan Pvt. Ltd. While he serves as the Consulting Editor, journalist Madhukar Bhave is the editor of the newspaper.

Controversies
In August 2011, Urban Development Deputy Secretary BK Gahart claimed in a deposition before the inquiry committee investigating the Adarsh Housing Society scam that while Rane was Chief Minister in the 1999 Shiv Sena-BJP ministry, he expedited a land allocation at the behest of Adarsh Housing Society. The BJP-Sena opposition unsuccessfully campaigned for Rane's resignation as Industry Minister, but when the inquiry committee completed its report in April 2013, indicting four former Chief Ministers of Maharashtra, Rane was not included.

In August 2021, while traveling under the BJP Jan Ashirwad Yatra initiative (a program under which Modi ministers traveled their home constituencies and regions), Rane claimed Uddhav Thackeray, the Chief Minister of Maharashtra following the 2019 Maharashtra political crisis, forgot the year of India's independence during an Independence Day speech, requiring prompting by an aide. Rane went on to declare that, "Had I been there, I would have given him a slap." Maharashtra Police arrested Rane in Ratnagiri on 24 August. A court conditionally granted him bail the following day.

In February 2022, an F.I.R. was registered against Rane for allegedly making defamatory and false statements about Disha Salian's death.

See also
 Narayan Rane ministry
List of chief ministers of Maharashtra
Shiv Sena

References

External links

 Facebook Page

1952 births
Living people
Chief Ministers of Maharashtra
Leaders of the Opposition in the Maharashtra Legislative Assembly
Maharashtra MLAs 1995–1999
Maharashtra MLAs 2004–2009
Maharashtra MLAs 2009–2014
Indian National Congress politicians
Shiv Sena politicians
Bharatiya Janata Party politicians from Maharashtra
Narendra Modi ministry